Snodland railway station is on the Medway Valley Line in Kent, England, serving the town of Snodland which lies some way to the west. The station and all trains that serve the station are operated by Southeastern.

History
The station was built in 1856, for the South Eastern Railway. It is a Grade II listed building, with two storeys: the lower floors were for the station offices and public rooms and the upper floors designed as the station master's flat. The station is located just to the north of the High Street, with a passenger footbridge and a level crossing over the railway. 

The former Queen's Head Hotel adjacent to the station was built to serve railway passengers: it closed in 1991 is now a residential care facility.

Snodland was once equipped with a goods shed and sidings located behind platform 2 of which the remaining supports the platform 2 canopy. To the immediate north of the station a pair of goods loops, remnants of which can be seen. The late 19th century signal box alongside the station has been closed and is now a listed building. 

The ticket office was originally closed around 1990, and in 2007, a PERTIS (Permit to Travel) ticket machine was installed just outside the entrance to the northbound platform. The ticket office was reopened in September 2016.

Services
All services at Snodland are operated by Southeastern using  and  EMUs.

The typical off-peak service in trains per hour is:
 2 tph to 
 2 tph to  via 

The station is also served by two peak hour high speed services in each direction between London St Pancras International and Maidstone West.

On Sundays, the service is reduced to hourly in each direction.

References

External links

Railway stations in Kent
DfT Category F2 stations
Former South Eastern Railway (UK) stations
Railway stations in Great Britain opened in 1856
Railway stations served by Southeastern
Snodland